Knott Nunatak is a nunatak  northwest of the northern extremity of the LeMay Range, in the west-central portion of Alexander Island, Antarctica. It was photographed from the air by the Ronne Antarctic Research Expedition, 1947–48, and mapped from these photographs by D. Searle of the Falkland Islands Dependencies Survey, 1960. The nunatak was named by the UK Antarctic Place-Names Committee in 1977 for Christopher E. Knott, British Antarctic Survey general assistant at Stonington Island, 1974–75, and Adelaide Island, 1975–76, who participated in a plane table survey of this area.

See also

 Adams Nunatak
 Hyperion Nunataks
 Stephenson Nunatak

References

Nunataks of Alexander Island